Back Tor may refer to:

 Back Tor (near Mam Tor), near Mam Tor in the High Peak of Derbyshire, England
 Back Tor (Derwent Edge), at Derwent Edge, in the Peak District National Park, Derbyshire, England